Henry George Skinner (7 July 1875 – 1946) was an English professional footballer who played as a wing half.

References

1875 births
Sportspeople from Windsor, Berkshire
English footballers
Association football wing halves
Windsor F.C. players
Uxbridge F.C. players
Queens Park Rangers F.C. players
Grimsby Town F.C. players
English Football League players
1946 deaths
Footballers from Berkshire